Eulalia Pérez de Guillén Mariné (1766? – June 11, 1878) was a Californio who was mayordoma of Mission San Gabriel Arcángel and grantee of Rancho del Rincón de San Pascual in the San Rafael Hills, in present-day Los Angeles County, California. She claimed to have been born in 1766, if so making her 112 years old at the time of her death in 1878, but her case has not been verified or fully proven.

Life

Early years

Eulalia Pérez was born in Loreto, the capital on the Baja California Peninsula of the Las Californias Province in the Viceroyalty of New Spain (in what is today the modern Mexican state of Baja California Sur), to Diego Pérez of Salamanca, Spain and Antonia Rosalia Cotes (or Cota) thought to be mulatta. Macedonio Gonzalez, one of Eulalia's nephews, knew Antonia Cota as Lucia Valenzuela according to Eulalia's English born son-in-law and author Michael C. White, aka: Miguel Blanco. Diego Pérez was a ship captain, thought to come from Salamanca—family members have been unable to trace records of his commission through the Archivo General de Indias or in Loreto, which has been ravaged by hurricanes over the centuries.  Her siblings were Teresa, Petra, Juana, Josefa, Bernardo, and León.

According to family lore, Capitan Pérez taught his daughter how to read and write, a fact later important to her survival and eventual prominence. She married Spanish army Sergeant Miguel Antonio Guillén at age fifteen. He was in the company at the Presidio of San Diego. They moved from Baja about 1800—on foot in those days—to the garrison at the new Mission San Gabriel, with their children Petra, Rosaria, and Isidoro.  Miguel died while later serving at the garrison at San Diego, leaving Pérez with several children.

Misión San Gabriel

Pérez managed to obtain employment at Misión San Gabriel, initially as cook and midwife for those such as Governor Pío Pico.  She was eventually made "keeper of the keys" (mayor doma) of the mission itself. Victoria Reid, an Indigenous Californian, worked as her assistant for a time in her young age.

Rancho del Rincon del San Pascual

When she retired, Mexican Governor José Figueroa rewarded Pérez as the grantee of  Rancho del Rincón de San Pascual with her husband Juan Mariné. 
Rancho San Pascual encompasses the present day cities of Pasadena, South Pasadena, and San Marino. This had been part of the homeland of the Tongva-Gabrieleño Native Americans for thousands of years.
Within the independent Mexican territory of Alta California, as a woman Pérez was unable to have ownership of property in her own name, so she married retired Mexican artillery lieutenant Juan Mariné (d. 1836).  (According to descendants, the fathers at San Gabriel Mission made her the grant under Spanish rule; when Mexico acquired Alta California, Pérez then married Juan Mariné because Mexican law did not allow women to own land.)

According to some descendants, Mariné and his sons lost all the land in a short time by gambling.  In another narrative, one of Marine's sons, Fruto, was an active soldier and could not take charge of the Rancho. He sold it to José Pérez and Enrique Sepúlveda in 1839.  Perez and Sepúlveda submitted a new land claim and in 1839 were re-granted their own title to Rancho San Pascual by Mexican Governor Juan Bautista Alvarado. Both built small adobe houses near the Arroyo Seco.  Jose Perez died in 1841 and Enrique Sepulveda died in 1843, which left Rancho San Pascual abandoned until a new grantee later that year.

Flores Adobe – South Pasadena

Pérez lived in the Adobe Flores, the 1839 adobe headquarters of Juan Perez on Rancho San Pascual on the southern slope of Raymond Hill. It was restored by architect Carleton Winslow, Sr. in the early 20th century and is still standing on Foothill Street in South Pasadena, and is on the National Register of Historic Places. It was named after a Californio hero, General Jose Maria Flores, the commander of the Mexican forces in Alta California during the Mexican–American War, who had camped near the adobe.

She spent many years of her remaining life in the homes of various daughters, including that of Maria Rita de Guillén de la Ossa, wife of Jose Vicente de la Ossa, owner of Rancho de los Encinos, foundation of Encino, California.  (What remains of that  rancho is now Los Encinos State Historic Park.)

Death

Pérez died in the  Los Angeles area on June 11, 1878. Her death certificate, located in the Santa Ana courthouse, records that she lived to be 140, but descendants for the most part agree on more conservative figures like 110 or 112 years old, making her a famous centenarian of early California and of Mexican (later U.S.) history.

Legacy
Eulalia Pérez de Guillén Mariné is one of only two non-clergy buried with the priests in the San Gabriel Mission courtyard cemetery.  Although there are an unknown number of Native Americans from the Kizh tribe or Gabrielino (as they were later identified due to their proximity to the Mission) in the courtyard cemetery, the priests were buried in a designated section immediately adjacent to the wall of the Mission in a place of honor. In Catholic tradition, burials closest to the most sacred areas of the church are reserved for individuals of stature, usually clergy.  Eulalia being honored in this way (Thomas Workman-Temple II, Mission Historian being the other), was a highly unusual honor at that time for a woman: a marble bench inscribed with her name marks the spot.

Her numerous descendants married other Californios from other founding Spanish and Mexican families of pre-statehood California.

Some of Eulalia Perez de Guillen Marine's (deceased) descendants include:
 Maria Rita de Guillen de la Ossa, wife of Don Jose Vicente de la Ossa, owners of Rancho de los Encinos in Encino, Los Angeles
  Katherine Kevane Murray, champion of English for Spanish-speaking children in California public schools
Alexander Howison Murray Jr. (1907-1993), twice mayor of Placerville
Patricia Murray Chambers (1936-2007)
 Victoria Duarte Cordova, California genealogist and historian, (1912-2005)

See also
 Lawrence Brooks (American veteran) (also 112 years old)

References

External links
 
 "The Reminiscences of Eulalia Pérez" in The Californians, The Magazine of California History (Grizzly Publications).
  Tales of California Yesterday by Rose L. Ellerbe (Los Angeles:  Warren T. Potter, 1916), "Three Cooks of San Gabriel," pp. 11–17
  J. Michael Walker: All the Saints of the City of the Angels (Berkeley:  HeyDay Books, 2008), pp. 142-145, 197
 Latinos in Pasadena by Roberta H. Martinez (San Francisco:  Aradia Publishing, 2009), pp. 16-18, 25, 28, 30, 34
 Latina Legacies:  Identity, Biography, and Community by Vicki  Ruíz and Virginia Sánchez Korrol (New York:  Oxford University Press, 2005), pp. 24-25
 
 
 In America by Susan Sontag (New York:  Macmillan, 2001), p. 193.
 Uppity Women of the New World by Vicki Leon (Newburyport, MA:  Conari, 2001), pp. 60-61
 
 Native Daughters of the Golden West: Doña Eulalia Pérez DeGuillén - California Pioneer Project
 Michael White Adobe website - (research section: information on Eulalia Pérez
 California History Quarterly: Eulalia Pérez de Guillén - 52:71-75; 53:141
 National Genealogical Society Quarterly: California's Centenarian: Eulalia Pérez de Guillén  - June 1962, Volume 50 Number 2
 UC Berkeley News: California women's "Collective Voice" exhibit
 Los Angeles Times: "At Flores Adobe, history stands solid"  - March 11, 2007
 Homestead Museum blogsite  - March 4, 2010
Photos
 Santa Clara University:  Eulalia Perez
 UC Berkeley News:  Exhibit's slideshow]
 Homestead Museum:  Eulalia Perez de Guillen Marine circa 1878

Californios
Land owners from California
Mexican midwives
1878 deaths
People from Pasadena, California
People from San Gabriel, California
People from South Pasadena, California
People from the San Gabriel Valley
History of Los Angeles County, California
Longevity claims
Religious workers from California
Roman Catholic Archdiocese of Los Angeles
19th century in Los Angeles
People from Loreto Municipality, Baja California Sur
Year of birth uncertain